A remix album is an album consisting of remixes or rerecorded versions of an artist's earlier released material. The first act who employed the format was American singer-songwriter Harry Nilsson (Aerial Pandemonium Ballet, 1971). As of 2007, the best-selling remix album of all time is Michael Jackson's Blood on the Dance Floor: HIStory in the Mix (1997).COLABORATION Vol.1 Sahrul Projectt

History and concept
Aerial Pandemonium Ballet (1971) by Harry Nilsson is credited as the first remix album. It was released after the successes of "Everybody's Talkin'" and The Point!, when he decided that his older material had started to sound dated. Neu!'s Neu! 2 (1973) has also been described as "in effect the first remix album", as many tracks see the duo "speed up, slow down, cut, doctor, and mutilate the material, sometimes beyond recognition".

In the 1980s, record companies would combine several kinds of electronic dance music, such as dance-pop, house, techno, trance, drum and bass, dubstep, hardstyle, and trap into full-length albums, creating a relatively low-overhead addition to the catalogs and balance sheets. Soft Cell's Non Stop Ecstatic Dancing (1981) and The Human League's Love and Dancing (1982) are credited for inventing the modern remix album. Since this time, this kind of release is not only seen as an easy cash-in for an artist and their label, but also as an opportunity to provide a second lease of life for a record. In the world of reggae music, it is not uncommon for a whole album to be remixed in a dub style.

Jennifer Lopez's album J to tha L–O! The Remixes is listed in the Guinness Book of World Records as the first remix album to debut at No.1 on the Billboard 200 chart.

List of best-selling remix albums

See also
 Dub music
 List of best-selling music artists

Notes

References

Album types